Springfield is an unincorporated community and census-designated place (CDP) located in the north central part of Arkansas in Conway County. It was first listed as a CDP in the 2020 census with a population of 223.

Education
It is in the South Conway County School District. It operates Morrilton High School.

Demographics

2020 census

Note: the US Census treats Hispanic/Latino as an ethnic category. This table excludes Latinos from the racial categories and assigns them to a separate category. Hispanics/Latinos can be of any race.

Sister Cities
 Sneed, Arkansas, since 1999

Notes

Encyclopedia of Arkansas History & Culture

Unincorporated communities in Conway County, Arkansas
Unincorporated communities in Arkansas
Census-designated places in Arkansas
Census-designated places in Conway County, Arkansas